Ashrafabad (also Romanized as Ashrafābād) is a village in Ujan-e Gharbi Rural District, in the Central District of Bostanabad County, East Azerbaijan Province, Iran. At the 2006 census, its population was 266, in 58 families.

References 

Populated places in Bostanabad County